9/2 may refer to:
September 2 (month-day date notation)
February 9 (day-month date notation)
A type of enneagram